Comarna is a commune in Iași County, Western Moldavia, Romania. It is composed of four villages: Comarna, Curagău, Osoi and Stânca.

Natives
 Radu Stroe

References

Communes in Iași County
Localities in Western Moldavia